KTES-LD (channel 40) is a low-power television station in Abilene, Texas, United States, airing programming from the digital multicast network TBD. It is owned and operated by Sinclair Broadcast Group alongside Sweetwater-licensed dual ABC/CW+ affiliate KTXS-TV, channel 12 (and its San Angelo–licensed satellite KTXE-LD, channel 12). The two stations share studios on North Clack Street in Abilene; KTES-LD's transmitter is located near Trent, Texas. In addition to its own digital signal, KTES-LD is simulcast in standard definition on KTXS-TV's third digital subchannel.

History

The station was founded on September 16, 1993, and began broadcasting on July 11, 1995. It previously carried Telemundo, but switched to This TV on September 1, 2010. Telemundo programming moved to KTAB-DT2 in 2014.

References

TES-LD
TBD (TV network) affiliates
Television channels and stations established in 1995
1995 establishments in Texas
Sinclair Broadcast Group
Low-power television stations in the United States